Toshihide Wakamatsu (若松俊秀, born December 6, 1965) is a Japanese actor born in Miyakonojo, Miyazaki, Japan.

Profile 
 He originally came to Tokyo to be a painter, but soon became interested acting in movies and plays.
 After graduating from Tokai University in 1988, he started acting.
 His acting debut was in May 1990, in the play "Champion", at the Aoyama Round Theater.
 His television debut was in "Vision of Family"(Mainichi Broadcast) as Tetsuo Kuramoto.
 Best known for his role as Gai Yūki/Black Condor in Choujin Sentai Jetman (February 1991-February 1992). He also performed the Jetman song "Condor of Flame" (炎のコンドル), His Character of Gai's image song. In addition to being a singer, he is also a composer. He reprised his role (albeit only as a ghost, as his character was confirmed to be dead) in episode 28 of the 35th Super Sentai series Kaizoku Sentai Gokaiger.
 His hobbies are surfing, painting and horseback riding.

Appearance Works

Movies 
 8 Man, For the all lonely nights (1992) - Detective Yokota
 Kunoichi ninpô-chô IV: Chûshingura hishô (1994)
 Kunoichi ninpô-chô: Yagyû gaiden (1998)
 After the Rain (1999)

TV Dramas 
 Vision of Family (Tetsuo Kuramoto)
 Choujin Sentai Jetman (1991-1992) - Gai Yuki / Black Condor
 Special Rescue Exceedraft (1992) - Koji Natori
 Homura Tatsu (1993, NHK) - Masatou Abe
 Kaizoku Sentai Gokaiger (2011) - Gai Yuki / Black Condor
 Again from the Heaven - Goro Yamaguchi
 Kurenawi - Koji Nishimoto

Stages 
 H～i!Jack!! -Hi, Mr. Jack!! - captain

External links 

Official Website created by person in question(Almost in Japanese)

1965 births
Living people
Japanese male actors
Tokai University alumni
People from Miyazaki Prefecture